Decenija (English: A Decade) is the eleventh studio album by Serbian singer Ceca. It was released in 2001.

Track listing

References

2001 albums
Ceca (singer) albums